The 2002–03 season was Toluca's 85th season in existence and their 50th consecutive season in the top flight of Mexican football. The club participated in the Apertura and Clausura tournaments of the Mexican Primera División and in the 2003 CONCACAF Champions' Cup (the entire tournament, except for the finals, were played on the first semester of 2003). Toluca were crowned champions of the Apertura 2002 tournament after defeating Morelia in the final.

In an unusual situation, Toluca had three different managers during the season. Ricardo La Volpe left the team after the 15th round of the Apertura tournament after being called to the Mexico national football team and appointed manager, substituting Javier Aguirre. La Volpe was replaced by Wilson Graniolatti, who resigned on 7 December, citing differences with Toluca's front office, specially with the chairman Rafael Lebrija. Graniolatti was replaced by Alberto Jorge, head of the Reserves and Academy, hired to manage the team for the rest of the playoffs (four games only). Since Jorge managed to win the Apertura tournament, he was ratified as manager of the team for the second half of the season.

This season remains as a highlight both in Mexican football and Toluca's history. Paraguayan striker José Cardozo broke several scoring records: Cardozo scored 29 goals in the Apertura 2002 regular season and was crowned as the tournament's top scorer; 36 goals in the Apertura 2002 tournament, including playoffs; and 58 goals in the 2002–03 Primera División season. All the three records remain unbeaten as of 2020.

Players

Apertura

Clausura

Transfers

In

Out

Competitions

Overview

1. Toluca qualified to the 2003 CONCACAF Champions' Cup final, to be played on the next season.

Torneo Apertura

League table

Matches

Playoffs

Quarterfinals

Semifinals

Final

Torneo Clausura

League table

Matches

Playoffs

Quarterfinals

CONCACAF Champions' Cup

Knockout phase

Round of 16

Quarterfinals

Semifinals

 

Final to be played on the next season.

Statistics

Appearances and goals

Goalscorers

Hat-tricks

Own goals

Notes

A.  Toluca classified to the 2003 CONCACAF Champions' Cup final, to be played on the team's next season.

References

Mexican football clubs 2002–03 season
Deportivo Toluca F.C. seasons